Evelyn Borchard Metzger (1911 New York City  -  2007) was an American modernist painter.

Life 
Evelyn Metzger studied at the Art Students League of New York with George Bridgman. She graduated from Vassar College; then she studied with Sally James Farnham and George Grosz, and Raphael Soyer. 

She lived  in South America for many years, where she worked with Cecilio Guzmán de Rojas.

She has participated in numerous group shows in museums and held several solo shows.
She had exhibitions at Gallerie Bellechasse, Papillon Gallery,  Palmer Gallery, and Johnson Museum of Art.
Her works are in the National Museum of Women in the Arts collection.

She donated artwork to the Metropolitan Museum of Art. and Brooklyn Museum.

Further reading

References 

1911 births

2007 deaths

American women artists
Art Students League of New York alumni